Southern Athabaskan (also Apachean) is a subfamily of Athabaskan languages spoken primarily in the Southwestern United States (including Arizona, New Mexico, Colorado, and Utah) with two outliers in Oklahoma and Texas. The language is spoken to a much lesser degree in the northern Mexican states of Sonora, Chihuahua, Durango, Coahuila, and Nuevo León.  Those languages are spoken by various groups of Apache and Navajo peoples. Elsewhere, Athabaskan is spoken by many indigenous groups of peoples in Alaska, Canada, Oregon and northern California.

There are several well-known historical people whose first language was Southern Athabaskan. Geronimo (Goyaałé) who spoke Chiricahua was a famous raider and war leader. Manuelito spoke Navajo and is famous for his leadership during and after the Long Walk of the Navajo.

Family division
The seven Southern Athabaskan languages can be divided into two groups according to the classification of Harry Hoijer: (I) Plains and (II) Southwestern.  Plains Apache is the only member of the Plains Apache group. The Southwestern group can be further divided into two subgroups (A) Western and (B) Eastern.  The Western subgroup consists of Western Apache, Navajo, Mescalero, and Chiricahua.  The Eastern subgroup consists of Jicarilla and Lipan.

I. Plains Apache ( Kiowa–Apache) (in Apache: Naishan)

II. Southwestern
 A. Western
 1. Chiricahua-Mescalero or Ndee Bizaa
 a. Chiricahua
 i. Chiricahua proper
 ii. Warm Springs
 b. Mescalero
 2. Navajo (a.k.a. Navahu˙) (in Navajo: Naabeehó bizaad, Diné bizaad)
 3. Western Apache (a.k.a. Coyotero Apache) (in Apache: Ndéé biyáti, Nnee biyati) 
 a. Tonto (in Apache: Dilzhę́’é)
 i. Northern Tonto
 ii. Southern Tonto
 b. White Mountain
 c. San Carlos
 d. Cibecue (ˀa˙paču)
 B. Eastern
 1. Jicarilla (a.k.a. Hikariya Apache) (in Apache: Abáachi, Abáachi mizaa)
 2. Lipan

Hoijer's classification is based primarily on the differences of the pronunciation of the initial consonant of noun and verb stems. His earlier 1938 classification had only two branches with Plains Apache grouped together with the other Eastern languages (i.e. with Jicarilla and Lipan).

Mescalero and Chiricahua are considered different languages even though they are mutually intelligible (Ethnologue considers them the same language).  Western Apache (especially the Dilzhe'e variety) and Navajo are closer to each other than either is to Mescalero/Chiricahua.  Lipan Apache and Plains Apache are nearly extinct (in fact Lipan may already be extinct).  Chiricahua is severely endangered.  Mescalero, Jicarilla, and Western Apache are considered endangered as well, but fortunately children are still learning the languages although the number of child speakers continues to decline.  Navajo is one of the most vigorous North American languages, but use among first-graders has declined from 90% to 30% in recent years (1998 N.Y. Times, April 8, p. A1).

Phonology

All Southern Athabaskan languages are somewhat similar in their phonology. The following description will concentrate on Western Apache. One can expect minor variations for other related languages (such as Navajo, Jicarilla, Chiricahua).

Consonants 
Southern Athabaskan languages generally have a consonant inventory similar to the set of 33 consonants below (based mostly on Western Apache):

 Only Navajo and Western Apache have glottalized nasals.

Orthography (consonants)
The practical orthography corresponds to the pronunciation of the Southern Athabaskan languages fairly well (as opposed to the writing systems of English or Vietnamese). Below is a table pairing up the phonetic notation with the orthographic symbol:

Some spelling conventions:
(see also #2 below)
 The fricative  is usually written as h, but after o it may be written as hw, especially in Western Apache (may be pronounced ).
 The fricative  is written gh the majority of the time, but before i and e it is written as y (& may be pronounced ), and before o it is written as w (& may be pronounced ).
 All words that begin with a vowel are pronounced with a glottal stop ’ .  This glottal stop is never written at the beginning of a word.
 Some words are pronounced either as d or n or nd, depending on the dialect of the speaker. The same is true with b and m in a few words.
 In many words n can occur in a syllable by itself in which case it is a syllabic .  This is not indicated in the spelling.

Vowels
Southern Athabaskan languages have four vowels of contrasting tongue dimensions (as written in a general "practical" orthography):

These vowels may also be short or long and oral (non-nasal) or nasal. Nasal vowels are indicated by an ogonek (or nasal hook) diacritic ˛ in Western Apache, Navajo, Mescalero, and Chiricahua; in Jicarilla, the nasal vowels are indicated by underlining the vowel, results in 16 different vowels:

IPA equivalents for Western Apache oral vowels:

 = ,
 = ,
 = ,
 = ,
 = ,
 = ,
 = ,
 = .

In Western Apache, there is a practice where orthographic vowels o and oo are written as u in certain contexts.  These contexts do not include nasalized vowels, so nasal u never occurs in the orthography.  This practice continues into the present (perhaps somewhat inconsistently).

However, in Harry Hoijer and other American linguists' work all o-vowels are written as o.  Similarly, Navajo does not use orthographic u, consistently writing this vowel as o.

In Chiricahua and Mescalero, this vowel is written as u in all contexts (including nasalized ų).

Other practices may be used in other Apachean languages.

Tone
Southern Athabaskan languages are tonal languages.  Hoijer and other linguists analyze Southern Athabaskan languages as having four tones (using Americanist transcription system):

 high  (marked with acute accent ´, Example: á)
 low  (marked with grave accent `, Example: à)
 rising  (marked with háček ˇ, Example: ǎ)
 falling  (marked with circumflex ˆ, Example: â)

Rising and falling tones are less common in the language (often occurring over morpheme boundaries) and often occur on long vowels.  Vowels can carry tone as well as syllabic n (Example: ń).

The practical orthography has tried to simplify the Americanist transcription system by representing only high tone with an acute accent and leaving low tone unmarked:

 high tone:  á
 low tone:  a

Then, niziz is written instead of the previous nìzìz.

Additionally, rising tone on long vowels is indicated by an unmarked first vowel and an acute accent on the second. It is vice versa for falling tone:

 rising: aá  (instead of Americanist: ǎ·)
 falling: áa  (instead of Americanist: â·)

Nasal vowels carry tone as well, resulting in a two diacritics on vowels with high tone: ą́ (presenting problems for computerization).  Recently, de Reuse (2006) has found that Western Apache also has a mid tone, which he indicates with a macron diacritic ¯, as in ō, ǭ.  In Chiricahua, a falling tone can occur on a syllabic n: n̂.

Here are some vowel contrasts involving nasalization, tone, and length from Chiricahua Apache:

 cha̧a̧   'feces'
 chaa   'beaver'
 shiban   'my buckskin'
 shibán   'my bread'
 bik’ai’   'his hip'
 bík’ai’   'his stepmother'
 hah’aał   'you two are going to chew it'
 hah’ał   'you two are chewing it'

Comparative phonology

Thus, as can be seen in the example below, when the Western languages have noun or verb stems that start with t, the related forms in the Eastern languages will start with a k:

He later revised his proposal in 1971 when he found that Plains Apache did not participate in the  merger, to consider Plains Apache to be equidistant from the other languages, now called Southwestern Apachean. Thus, some stems that originally started with *k̯ in Proto-Athabascan start with ch in Plains Apache, but the other languages start with ts.

Morris Opler (1975) has suggested that Hoijer's original formulation that Jicarilla and Lipan in an Eastern branch was more in agreement with the cultural similarities between both and their differences from the other Western Apachean groups. Other linguists, particularly Michael Krauss (1973), have noted that a classification based only on the initial consonants of noun and verb stems is arbitrary and when other sound correspondences are considered the relationships between the languages appear to be more complex. Additionally, it has been pointed out by Martin Huld (1983) that since Plains Apache does not merge Proto-Athabascan , Plains Apache cannot be considered an Apachean language as defined by Hoijer.

Other differences and similarities among the Southern Athabaskan languages can be observed in the following modified and abbreviated Swadesh list:

Grammar

References

Further reading

 Cremony, John Carey. 1868. Life Among the Apaches. A. Roman, 1868. Length 322 pages. Chapter XX discusses the Apache language, number system, and grammar.
 Hoijer, Harry.  (1938).  The southern Athapaskan languages.  American Anthropologist, 40 (1), 75-87.
 Hoijer, Harry.  (1945).  Classificatory verb stems in the Apachean languages.  International Journal of American Linguistics, 11 (1), 13-23.
 Hoijer, Harry.  (1945).  The Apachean verb, part I: Verb structure and pronominal prefixes.  International Journal of American Linguistics, 11 (4), 193-203.
 Hoijer, Harry.  (1946).  The Apachean verb, part II: The prefixes for mode and tense.  International Journal of American Linguistics, 12 (1), 1-13.
 Hoijer, Harry.  (1946).  The Apachean verb, part III: The classifiers.  International Journal of American Linguistics, 12 (2), 51-59.
 Hoijer, Harry. (1948). The Apachean verb, part IV: Major form classes. International Journal of American Linguistics, 14 (4), 247–259.
 Hoijer, Harry. (1949). The Apachean verb, part V: The theme and prefix complex. International Journal of American Linguistics, 15 (1), 12–22.
 Hoijer, Harry.  (1956).  The Chronology of the Athapaskan languages.  International Journal of American Linguistics, 22 (4), 219-232.
 Hoijer, Harry. (1963). The Athapaskan languages. In H. Hoijer (Ed.), Studies in the Athapaskan languages (pp. 1–29). University of California publications in linguistics 29. Berkeley: University of California Press.
 Hoijer, Harry (Ed.). (1963).  Studies in the Athapaskan languages.  University of California publications in linguistics 29.  Berkeley: University of California Press.
 Hoijer, Harry. (1971). The position of the Apachean languages in the Athapaskan stock. In K. H. Basso & M. E. Opler (Eds.), Apachean culture history and ethnology (pp. 3–6). Anthropological papers of the University of Arizona (No. 21). Tucson: University of Arizona Press.
 Hymes, Dell H. (1957). A note on Athapaskan glottochronology. International Journal of American Linguistics, 22 (4), 291-297.
 Liebe-Harkot, Marie-Louise. (1984). A comparison of Apachean languages, exemplified by the verb system for handling verbs. In H. Krenn, J. Niemeyer, & U. Eberhardt (Eds.), Sprache und Text: Akten des 18: Linguistischen Kolloquiums, Linz 1983. Linguistische Arbeiten (Max Niemeyer Verlag) (Nos. 145-146). Tübingen: Max Niemeyer Verlag.  (Bd. 1);  (Bd. 2).
 de Reuse, Willem J. (2001). Prototypes and fuzziness in the system and usage of Apachean classificatory verb stems. In S. Tuttle & G. Holton (Eds.), Proceedings of the 2001 Athabaskan Languages Conference (No. 1, pp. 75–94). Fairbanks, AK: Alaska Native Language Center.
 Sapir, Edward. (1936). Linguistic evidence suggestive of the northern origin of the Navaho. American Anthropologist, 38 (2), 224-235.
 Young, Robert W.  (1983).  Apachean languages.  In A. Ortiz, W. C. Sturtevant (Eds.), Handbook of North American Indians: Southwest (Vol. 10, pp. 393–400).  Washington: Smithsonian Institution.  .
Chiricahua
 Hoijer, Harry. (n.d.). Chiricahua Apache stems.  (Unpublished manuscript).
 Hoijer, Harry.  (1938).  Chiricahua and Mescalero Apache texts.  Chicago: University of Chicago Press.  .
 Hoijer, Harry.  (1939).  Chiricahua loan-words from Spanish.  Language, 15 (2), 110-115.
 Hoijer, Harry.  (1946).  Chiricahua Apache.  In C. Osgood (Ed.), Linguistic structures in North America.  New York: Wenner-Green Foundation for Anthropological Research.
 Opler, Morris E., & Hoijer, Harry.  (1940). The raid and war-path language of the Chiricahua Apache.  Language, 42 (4), 617-634.
 Pinnow, Jürgen. (1988). Die Sprache der Chiricahua-Apachen: Mit Seitenblicken auf das Mescalero [The language of the Chiricahua Apache: With side glances at the Mescalero]. Hamburg: Helmut Buske Verlag.
 Webster, Anthony K. (1999). Sam Kenoi's "Coyote and the Whiteman": Contact in and out of a Chiricahua narrative. In A. Trefzer & R. L. Murray (Eds.), Reclaiming Native American cultures, proceedings of the Native American Symposium (pp. 67–80). Durant, OK: Southeastern Oklahoma State University.
 Webster, Anthony K. (1999). Sam Kenoi's coyote stories: Poetics and rhetoric in some Chiricahua Apache narratives. American Indian Culture and Research Journal, 23, 137-163.
 Webster, Anthony K. (1999). Lisandro Medez's "Coyote and Deer": On reciprocity, narrative structures, and interactions. American Indian Quarterly, 23, 1-24.
 Webster, Anthony K. (2006). On Speaking to Him (Coyote): The Discourse Function of the yi-/bi- Alternation in Some Chiricahua Apache Narratives. Southwest Journal of Linguistics, 25(2), 143-160.
Mescalero
 Breunginger, Evelyn; Hugar, Elbys; & Lathan, Ellen Ann. (1982). Mescalero Apache dictionary. Mescalero: NM: Mescalero Apache Tribe.
 Hoijer, Harry.  (1938).  Chiricahua and Mescalero Apache texts.  Chicago: University of Chicago Press.  .
 Pinnow, Jürgen. (1988). Die Sprache der Chiricahua-Apachen: Mit Seitenblicken auf das Mescalero [The language of the Chiricahua Apache: With side glances at the Mescalero]. Hamburg: Helmut Buske Verlag.
 Rushforth, Scott. (1991). Uses of Bearlake and Mescalero (Athapaskan) classificatory verbs. International Journal of American Linguistics, 57, 251-266.
Jicarilla
 Anthropological papers of the American Museum of Natural History (Vol. 8).  New York: The American Museum of Natural History.
 Phone, Wilhelmina; Olson, Maureen; & Martinez, Matilda. (forthcoming). Abáachi mizaa łáo iłkee’ shijai: Dictionary of Jicarilla Apache. Axelrod, Melissa; Gómez de García, Jule; Lachler, Jordan; & Burke, Sean (Eds.). UNM Press. (Estimated publication date: summer 2006).
 Phone, Wilma; & Torivio, Patricia. (1981). Jicarilla mizaa medaóołkai dáłáéé. Albuquerque: Native American Materials Development Center.
 Tuttle, Siri G.; & Sandoval, Merton. (2002). Jicarilla Apache. Journal of the International Phonetic Association, 32, 105-112.
 Vicenti, Carson. (1981). Jicarilla Apache dictionary. Native American Materials Development Center, Ramah Navajo School Board.
 Wilson, Alan, & Vigil Martine, Rita.  (1996).  Apache (Jicarilla).  Guilford, CT: Audio-Forum.  . (Includes book and cassette recording).
Navajo

Western Apache
 Basso, Keith H.  (1979).  Portraits of "the whiteman": Linguistic play and cultural symbols among the Western Apache.  Cambridge: Cambridge University Press.  .
 Basso, Keith H.  (1990).  Western Apache language and culture: Essays in linguistic anthropology.  Tucson: University of Arizona Press.  .
 Basso, Keith H.  (1996).  Wisdom sits in places: Landscape and language among the Western Apache.  Albuquerque: University of New Mexico Press.  .
 Bray, Dorothy, & White Mountain Apache Tribe.  (1998).  Western Apache-English dictionary: A community-generated bilingual dictionary.  Tempe, AZ: Bilingual Press.  .
 Durbin, Marshall. (1964). A componential analysis of the San Carlos dialect of Western Apache: A study based on the analysis of the phonology, morphophonics, and morphemics. (Doctoral dissertation, State University of New York, Buffalo).
 Anthropological papers of the American Museum of Natural History, (Vol. 24, Part 3).  New York: The American Museum of Natural History.
 Anthropological papers of the American Museum of Natural History, (Vol. 24, Part 4).  New York: The American Museum of Natural History.
 Goodwin, Grenville.  (1939).  Myth and tales of the White Mountain Apache.  New York: American Folk-Lore Society (J. J. Augustin).  
 Gordon, Matthew; Potter, Brian; Dawson, John; de Reuse, Willem; & Ladefoged, Peter.  (2001).  Phonetic structures of Western Apache.  International Journal of American Linguistics, 67 (4), 415-481.
 Greenfeld, Philip J. (1971). Playing card names in Western Apache. International Journal of American Linguistics, 37 (3), 195-196.
 Greenfeld, Philip J. (1972). The phonological hierarchy of the White Mountain dialect of Western Apache. (Doctoral dissertation, University of Arizona, Tucson).
 Greenfeld, Philip J. (1978). Some special phonological characteristics of the White Mountain dialect of Apachean. Anthropological Linguistics, 20 (1), 150-157.
 Greenfeld, Philip J. (1984). A treatment for stress in Apache. International Journal of American Linguistics, 50 (1), 105-111.
 Hill, Faith. (1963). Some comparisons between the San Carlos and White Mountain dialects of Western Apache. In H. Hoijer (Ed.), Studies in the Athapaskan languages (pp. 149–154). University of California publications in linguistics 29. Berkeley: University of California Press.
 Mierau, Eric.  (1963).  Concerning Yavapai-Apache bilingualism.  International Journal of American Linguistics, 29 (1), 1-3.
 Potter, Brian. (1997). Wh/indefinites and the structure of the clause in Western Apache. (Doctoral dissertation, University of California, Los Angeles.
 de Reuse, Willem J.  (1993).  Stylistic and dialectal variation in Western Apache phonology. Unpublished manuscript, Department of Anthropology, University of Arizona, Tucson.
 de Reuse, Willem J. (2006). A practical grammar of the San Carlos Apache language. Lincom Studies in Native American Linguistics 51. Lincom. .
 White Mountain Apache Culture Center.  (1972).  Western Apache dictionary.  Fort Apache, AZ: White Mountain Apache Culture Center.
 White Mountain Apache Culture Center.  (1983).  New! keys to reading and writing Apache (rev. ed.).  Fort Apache, AZ: White Mountain Apache Culture Center.
Other
 Hoijer, Harry. (1975). The history and customs of the Lipan, as told by Augustina Zuazua. Linguistics, 161, 5-38.
 Bittle. 1963. “Kiowa–Apache.” In Studies in the Athapaskan Languages. (Ed. Hoijer, Harry). University of California Studies in Linguistics vol. 29. Berkeley: California UP. 76-101.

External links
 How Different can Languages be?: The grammatical mosaic of Navajo
  Simplified Apache Pronunciation
 Chiricahua and Mescalero Texts
 Grammatical Sketch of Chiricahua/Mescalero
 Other Apache Ethnographical Sources
 Apache texts
 Goddard's Jicarilla Texts (translation only)
 Issues in Language Textbook Development: The Case of Western Apache
 White Mountain Apache Language: Issues in Language Shift, Textbook Development, and Native Speaker-University Collaboration
 Phonetic Structures of Western Apache (318 kb PDF: technical work on acoustic phonetics)
 EtymOnline.com , Apache Online Etymology Dictionary
 Language-Museum.com, Apache Language Sample

 

Indigenous languages of the North American Southwest
Indigenous languages of the Southwestern United States
Indigenous languages of North America

nv:Wikipedia in Navajo